Karl Hopf (Hamm, Westphalia, February 19, 1832 – Wiesbaden, August 23, 1873) or Carl Hermann Friedrich Johann Hopf was a historian and an expert in Medieval Greece, both Byzantine and Frankish.

Career 

Hopf graduated from the University of Bonn, where he received his Ph.D. in the medieval history of Greece. He worked as a professor and librarian in the University of Greifswald and the University of Königsberg. He frequently visited Italian and Greek medieval archives to find sources for his works.

Notable works 

His notable works include the "History of Greece from the beginning of Middle Ages to the year 1821". It was considered the most important addition made to the knowledge about Byzantine and modern Greek history in the period 1863-1877, when considerable additions had been made.

In his 1870 work, Hopf dealt with the migrations of the Romani people. According to him, after they came from the East, they were first concentrated in the Romanian lands. To escape slavery, they went to Serbia, and the Serbian Emperor Stefan Dušan dispersed them throughout the Balkans, as far as Greece.

Sources 
 Peter Wirth: Hopf, Carl. In: Neue Deutsche Biographie (NDB). Band 9. Duncker & Humblot, Berlin 1972, S. 609.
 Ludwig Streit: Hopf, Karl. In: Allgemeine Deutsche Biographie (ADB). Band 13. Duncker & Humblot, Leipzig 1881, S. 102–104.

Works 
 List of works published by Karl Hopf, listed in catalogue of National library in Berlin

References

External links 
 Karl Hopf (ed.) Chroniques gréco-romanes inédites ou peu connues, 1873 on Google Books

1832 births
1873 deaths
German Byzantinists
People from the Province of Westphalia
German medievalists
University of Bonn alumni
Academic staff of the University of Königsberg
People from Hamm
German male non-fiction writers

Scholars of Byzantine history